Jupiter Lander is a clone of Lunar Lander developed by HAL Laboratory and published by Commodore in 1981 for the VIC-20. In 1982, it was an early release for the  new Commodore 64.

Reception
Harvey B. Herman for Compute! said "An old fogey, like me, enjoyed it, but found it almost impossible to land on more difficult sites. The kids found it challenging but learned how to do it almost every time."

Henry Cohen for Electronic Games said "Jupiter Lander is a high-resolution, full-color "kissin cousin" to the familiar arcade Lunar Lander."

Michael Blanchet for Electronic Fun with Computers & Games said "this is one of those games that is very satisfying once you've mastered it".

David Busch for Creative Computing said "What makes the Jupiter Lander game challenging is the speed readout at the side of the screen, showing speed in meters per second."

References

External links
1984 Software Encyclopedia from Electronic Games
The official PasocomMini PC-8001 website  showing the list of included games which contains the PC-8001 version of Jupiter Lander

1981 video games
Commodore 64 games
Fiction set on Jupiter
HAL Laboratory games
NEC PC-8001 games
Space flight simulator games
VIC-20 games
Video game clones
Video games developed in Japan